Gojo, an Indian comic book character, is one of the earliest among numerous titles published by Raj Comics.

Origin
In the Dvapara Yuga, demons ruled over the world with terror and chaos. Their leader, Khunkhara was a cruel and powerful demon who sought to displace gods as the deities of the Earth. He killed countless humans and gods alike by destroying cities and empires, with numerous brutal acts, thereby establishing himself as the most terrifying and feared being on earth.
The Hrishi-Munies were also victimised, as their Yagyas were always interrupted by the demons. Hrishi Taptamukhi, a highly respected Muni, determined to remove the demons from the face of the earth, started a yagya to request the Gods to send them the one who will cleanse earth from the dirt of evil. Out of this yagya, appeared 7 mystical beings and at last, Gojo. He ordered the 7 mystical beings who appeared before him to enter his body. From there, he embarked on his journey to fight and destroy evil, and restore peace.
On his journey, Gojo fought the spider-like Mankat Demons, who were attacking a nearby city defeating them with ease. Their leader, Mankot forfeited to the might of Gojo. Mankot, who felt a change of heart after this fight, offered to become his ride forever, and to help him in his quest of fighting evil. Gojo, along with his new friend then faced the leader of the demons, Khunkhara. After a long and hefty battle, Gojo finally succeeded in killing Khunkhara.
Although the demon Chief was killed, Gojo's objective was not completed, to eliminate evil for once and for all. Thus he resumed his journey of fighting evil, along with the 7 Mystical beings and his trusted friend/ride Mankot. Since then, he has risked his life and challenged evil numerous times to meet the goal for which he was born.

Plot summary

Attributes

Powers and abilities
Gojo's body is the host for 7 mystical beings who were created from the same yagya out of which Gojo was formed. In battle, he can summon any of them and use there respected powers and abilities. The 7 Beings and their powers/abilities are:
 Bijlika: As her name suggests, she can manipulate, absorb, and generate electricity for various purposes and effects in battle. She is the only female among the seven.
 Teesri Aankh: A being with an additional eye on his forehead, similar to the Hindu god Shiva. His "third eye" is known to wreak havoc on evil when opened.
 Sanharak: Sanharak's body is fully composed of a stone-like substance, which grants him super-human strength and durability.
 Shaakaal: He is a humanoid with eagle-like physiology. His primary power is flight facilitated by a pair of wings on his back. He also has enhanced vision, razor-sharp claws and beak, and can control eagles.
 Gurughantaal: A being with spiked body, Gurughantaal can create (or summon) any object, including weapons of his choice out of nowhere.
 Billoura: Billoura has cat-like physiology, which grants him super-human agility, reflexes, speed, balance, and coordination, enhanced senses, razor-sharp claws, and fangs. He also has limited shapeshifting, and can transform from a feline humanoid to an ordinary cat.
 Judoka: He has no super-human powers, but he is master of all of the fighting styles and arts ever existed.

Family, Friends, and Allies
Mankot: The human-spider ride of Gojo.

Enemies
JSP

Titles
Raj Comics has published the following titles as Gojo's issues:

Discussion forum
Raj Comics hosts a discussion forum, with a section specially devoted to Gojo.
 Forum by Raj Comics

Indian comics
Raj Comics superheroes
Indian superheroes
Indian mythology in popular culture
Hindu mythology in popular culture